Gasterocome is a genus of moths in the family Geometridae described by Warren in 1894.

Species
Gasterocome conspicuaria (Leech, 1897)
Gasterocome fidoniaria (Snellen, 1881)
Gasterocome pannosaria (Moore, 1868)
Gasterocome polyspathes Prout, 1934

References

Boarmiini